Via Aemilia may refer to three ancient roads:

 Via Aemilia, a major Roman road in North-Eastern Italy
 Via Aemilia Scauri, a Roman road in North-Western Italy
 , a Roman road in Southern Italy